The Western Manufactured Housing Communities Association (WMA) is a nonprofit organization formed in 1945 for the exclusive purpose of promoting and protecting the interests of owners, operators and developers of manufactured home communities in California.

See also
 Mobilehome Park

External links
 www.wma.org

Non-profit organizations based in California